The  (Land of Herve) is a 420 km2 natural region of Wallonia, between the rivers Vesdre and Meuse and the borders separating Belgium from the Netherlands and Germany.

The region is named after the ancient town of Herve, which is at its centre.

Economically the Pays de Herve mainly has an agricultural character. The region is known for Herve cheese.

Towns
Population centres in this region are: Aubel, Beyne-Heusay, Blegny, Dalhem, Fléron, Herve, Kelmis, Lontzen, Olne, Plombières, Soumagne, Thimister-Clermont, Visé, Voeren and Welkenraedt.

Maps

Natural regions of Belgium
Areas of Belgium
Regions of Flanders
Regions of Wallonia
Landforms of Flanders
Landforms of Wallonia
Landforms of Liège Province
Landforms of Limburg (Belgium)
Herve